James A. Richard (April 29, 1928 – October 25, 2002) was a sound editor.
	
He was nominated for a Best Sound Editing at the 1967 Academy Awards for In the Heat of the Night. He also did sound editing on a few episodes of Honey West and Fury. He died in 2002.

Selected filmography
Jonathan Livingston Seagull (1973) (as Jim Richard)
Harold and Maude (1971) (as James A. Richards) 
Little Big Man (1970) (as James A. Richard)
Gaily, Gaily (1969) (as James A. Richard)
The Thomas Crown Affair (1968)
In the Heat of the Night (1967)
Ship of Fools (1965)
Taras Bulba (1962)
The Giant Gila Monster (1959)

References

External links

Sound editors
1928 births
2002 deaths